POF Music, "Product of France" is an electronic music record label based in Paris, France.  It is home to artists such as Joking Sphinx and Moksha.

See also
 List of record labels

External links 
 Archive.org: POF Music website
 Discogs: POF Music

References 

Electronic music record labels
French record labels